The 2020 Supercar Challenge powered by Hankook was the twentieth Supercar Challenge season since it replaced the Supercar Cup in 2001. It began at Circuit Zolder on 7 August and ended at Circuit Zandvoort on 11 October.

Calendar

Entry list

Race results

Drivers' championships

GT
{|
|valign="top"|

Supersport

Sport

Notes

References

External links

2020 in motorsport
2020 in Dutch motorsport
2020 in European sport